Desideratum is the eighth full-length studio album by British extreme metal band Anaal Nathrakh. It was released on 28 October 2014 on Metal Blade Records.

Track listing

Personnel

Anaal Nathrakh

 Dave Hunt (a.k.a. V.I.T.R.I.O.L.) – vocals
 Mick Kenney (a.k.a. Irrumator) – guitar, bass, programming, artwork, production

Additional personnel

GoreTech – electronics
Niklas Kvarforth (of Shining) – vocals on "Rage and Red"

References

Anaal Nathrakh albums
2014 albums
Metal Blade Records albums